Events from the year 1701 in Canada.

Incumbents
French Monarch: Louis XIV
English, Scottish and Irish Monarch: William III

Governors
Governor General of New France: Louis-Hector de Callière
Governor of Acadia: Claude-Sébastien de Villieu
Colonial Governor of Louisiana: Sauvolle
Governor of Plaisance: Joseph de Monic

Events

Full date unknown
 The Peace of Montreal signed: peace treaty between the Iroquois Confederacy and the French. Considered one of the major events in Canada's history, sometimes called the "great peace."
 Detroit, Michigan founded as Fort Pontchartrain du détroit by Antoine de Lamothe Cadillac.
 War of the Spanish Succession begins in Europe; spreads to North America (Queen Anne's War) in 1702.

Births
October 15 - Marie-Marguerite d'Youville, founder of the "Grey Nuns" order; died 1771; she was beatified in 1959, the first Canadian-born saint.

Deaths
 April 4 - Guillaume Couture, diplomat in New France (born 1618).

Historical documents
Hundreds of English fishers settled in Newfoundland squeeze out fishing ships, while New England merchants undercut English trade

New York official says Five Nations resent that English colonies did not join them in recent costly war against French

English cajole Onondaga chief sachem not to fear French, just before Five Nations and other Indigenous sign Great Peace of Montreal

New York lieutenant-governor meets with Five Nations leaders to renew their Covenant Chain alliance against French

See also
List of years in Canada

References

 
Canada
01